Bum is a chiefdom in Bonthe District of Sierra Leone. As of 2004 it had a population of 18,827.

References

Chiefdoms of Sierra Leone
Southern Province, Sierra Leone